The Minnesota Senate, District 10, is in north-central Minnesota. It is currently represented by Republican Carrie Ruud.

List of senators

References

Minnesota Senate districts
Aitkin County, Minnesota
Crow Wing County, Minnesota